K. R. Mangalam World School is a school situated in New Delhi, India. It was established in 2003.  The school has Eight branches of KRM and also handles the management of Summer Fields School, Kailash Colony.

K.R. Mangalam World School has been awarded Best Educational Group for School in Asia by THE.
K.R. Mangalam is launching Global School - IB Board in 2020 in Greater Kailash-I
The KRM Management also established a K.R. Mangalam University in 2013 at Sohna Road, Gurgaon, Delhi/ NCR. Mangalam UniversityK.R. Mangalam University

Houses
Each house is headed by one boy and one girl known as house captains.. A member of the staff assisted by several other teachers acts as the house mistress. Points are awarded to the house on the basis of display boards, maintenance of discipline, news, thoughts etc. There are four houses: ruby , saphire, emerald and topaz .  Inter House competitions are organized throughout the year.

Vikas Puri Branch

Other branches : 
K.R. Mangalam World School, Greater Noida 
K.R. Mangalam World School, Faridabad
K.R. Mangalam World School, Gurgaon
K.R. Mangalam World School, Vaishali, Ghaziabad

The Confluence
The Vikas Puri Branch was first to organise an Inter-School Competitive Event by the name of The Confluence. The cultural event holds numerous competitions varying from the field of drama, music, dance, computer, science, literature, mathematics, business, etc.

The Confluence Club
Each year, this event is organised and managed by a group of Senior Students, together called as The Confluence Club
 Core 2011-12 - Siddhant Gupta, Archit Goel, Rohan Shorey, Poorva Gupta, Lakshi Aggarwal, Siddhant Puri, Poonam Chawla.
 Core 2012-13 - Chiranjeev Singh, Anaghaa Bhalla, Harnaman Mehta, Gurkirat Singh Gill, Mehak Bhari, Niharika Pagore, Rohan Kwatra, Sahil Aggarwal and Shreya Chopra
 Core 2013-14 - Syalli Kaur, Katyayn Sharma, Shubham Puri, Ishani Khanna, Simran Kalsi, Punya Kapoor, Harmeet Singh, Rohan Mangla, Aashima Sawhney, Amaanee Dhanjal
 Core 2014-15 - Kshitij Singh, Divyanshu Sayal, Rishabh Chadha, Tanya Sethi, Divya Aggarwal, Aishwarya Mittal, Hardik Deep Chawla, Ishjot Mehta, Aseem Malik, Medha Sharma, Arshdeep Kaur
 Core 2022-23 - Saksham Miglani, Angad Singh Basu, Iddham Kumar, Manya Bhatnagar, Baani Kapoor, Akshara Tomar, Shorya Kumar, Isheet Singh

References

Schools in West Delhi
Schools in Delhi
2003 establishments in Delhi